Broken in the Wars is a 1919 British silent drama film directed by Cecil Hepworth and starring Henry Edwards, Chrissie White and Alma Taylor. The Pensions Minister John Hodge appeared in the film to promote the King's Fund, which supported recently demobilised ex-servicemen. The fund had been criticized by veterans' organisations on the grounds that it was a government backed charity providing relief that should have been provided by the state. The film attempts to assure audiences that the King's Fund is not a charity. A cobbler returning from the First World War is persuaded by his aristocratic former employer and the Pensions Minister to receive a grant that will enable him to open his own shop. It was made by Hepworth Picture Plays. The film is available to view online in the UK via the BFI Player

Cast
 Henry Edwards - Joe
 Chrissie White - Mrs. Joe
 Alma Taylor - Lady Dorothea
 John Hodge - Himself
 Gerald Ames - Customer
 John MacAndrews - Customer

References

Bibliography
 Bamford, Kenton. Distorted Images: British National Identity and Film in the 1920s. I.B. Tauris, 1999.

External links

https://player.bfi.org.uk/free/film/watch-broken-in-the-wars-1918-online
https://atthepictures.photo.blog/2018/09/10/broken-in-the-wars-and-the-kings-fund/

1919 films
1919 drama films
Films directed by Cecil Hepworth
British silent short films
British drama films
Hepworth Pictures films
British black-and-white films
1910s English-language films
1910s British films
Silent drama films